The Senior Skull Society is a collegiate honor society at the University of Maine, founded on December 14, 1906, by 11 men of various fraternities. The purpose was "to recognize dedicated service to the University of Maine, to promote campus spirit, to keep an eye on the fraternities, and to discipline freshmen". In 1913, the president of the organization created a viable interfraternity council, and the society has existed without interruption since World War II when it ceased to exist for only 3 years. The society promotes the values of friendship, obligation, academics, dignity, and the standards and traditions of the University of Maine.

Notable alumni
Raymond H. Fogler, Class of 1915

See also
Collegiate secret societies in North America

References 

Collegiate secret societies
Student organizations established in 1906
1906 establishments in Maine